Scrope Berdmore (23 November 1744 – 16 December 1814) was an English academic administrator at the University of Oxford.

Berdmore was elected Warden (head) of Merton College, Oxford in 1790, a post he held until 1810.
While Warden at Merton College, Berdmore was also Vice-Chancellor of Oxford University from 1796 until 1797.

References

1744 births
1814 deaths
Wardens of Merton College, Oxford
Vice-Chancellors of the University of Oxford